Keim may refer to:

People

In arts and media
Adelaide Keim, American actress
Betty Lou Keim, American actress
Claire Keim, French actress and singer
De Benneville Randolph Keim, American journalist and diplomat
Loren Keim, American author

In government, law, and military
August Keim, German military officer
De Benneville Randolph Keim, American journalist and diplomat
George May Keim, American senator
Stephen Keim, Australian lawyer
William High Keim, American senator

In science and academia
Daniel A. Keim, German computer scientist
Donald Keim, American economist
Karl Theodor Keim, German theologian
Wilhelm Keim, German chemist

In sport
Andreas Keim, German footballer
Jenny Keim, American swimmer
Mike Keim, American football player
Steve Keim, American football player

Places
Keim Homestead, a historic farm
Keim Peak, in the Usarp Mountains of Antarctica

Other uses
Keim's process, a technique of fresco preparation and painting
Cell (music), concept in German music theory